Sarkam or Sarkom or Sar Kom may refer to:
 Sarkam, Fin, Bandar Abbas County, Hormozgan Province
 Sarkam, Takht, Bandar Abbas County, Hormozgan Province
 Sarkam, Minab, Hormozgan Province
 Sarkom, Rudan, Hormozgan Province
 Sarkam, Sistan and Baluchestan